A Child of the Wild is a 1917 American silent drama film directed by John G. Adolfi and starring June Caprice, Frank Morgan and Jane Lee.

Another film of the same name was released in 1910 by Bison Film Company.

Cast
 June Caprice as June Griest 
 Frank Morgan as Frank Trent 
 Tom Brooke as June's Father 
 Richard Neill as Bob Gale 
 Jane Lee as Jane 
 John W. Kellette as A Tramp 
 John G. Adolfi as A Tramp

References

Bibliography
 Solomon, Aubrey. The Fox Film Corporation, 1915-1935: A History and Filmography. McFarland, 2011.

External links

1917 films
1917 drama films
Silent American drama films
Films directed by John G. Adolfi
American silent feature films
1910s English-language films
American black-and-white films
Fox Film films
Films set in Tennessee
1910s American films